Equisetum fluviatile, the water horsetail or swamp horsetail, is a vascular plant that commonly grows in dense colonies along freshwater shorelines or in shallow water in ponds, swamps, ditches, and other sluggish or still waters with mud bottoms. It is a perennial herbaceous species, growing 30–100 cm (rarely 140 cm) tall with erect dark green stems 2–8 mm in diameter, smooth, with about 10–30 fine ridges. At each joint, the stem has a whorl of tiny, black-tipped scale leaves 5–10 mm long. Many, but not all, stems also have whorls of short ascending and spreading branches 1–5 cm long, with the longest branches on the lower middle of the stem. The side branches are slender, dark green, and have 1–8 nodes with a whorl of five scale leaves at each node. The water horsetail has the largest central hollow of the horsetails, with 80% of the stem diameter typically being hollow.

The stems readily pull apart at the joints, and both fertile and sterile stems look alike.

The water horsetail reproduces both by spores and vegetatively by rhizomes. It primarily reproduces by vegetative means, with the majority of shoots arising from rhizomes. Spores are produced in blunt-tipped cones at the tips of some stems. The spore cones are yellowish-green, 1–2 cm long and 1 cm broad, with numerous scales in dense whorls.

The water horsetail ranges throughout the temperate Northern Hemisphere, from Eurasia south to central Spain, Italy, the Caucasus, China, Korea and Japan, and in North America from the Aleutian Islands to Newfoundland, south to Oregon, Idaho, northwest Montana, northeast Wyoming, West Virginia and Virginia.

This horsetail is sometimes seen as an invasive species because it is very hardy and tends to overwhelm other garden plants unless it is contained. When planting, it is best to plant them with the rhizome in a container.

The water horsetail is most often confused with the marsh horsetail E. palustre, which has rougher stems with fewer (4-8) stem ridges with a smaller hollow in the stem centre, and longer spore cones 2–4 cm long.

Uses
The water horsetail has historically been used by both Europeans and Native Americans for scouring, sanding, and filing because of the high silica content in the stems. Early spring shoots were eaten. Medically it was used by the ancient Greeks and Romans to stop bleeding and treat kidney ailments, ulcers, and tuberculosis, and by the ancient Chinese to treat superficial visual obstructions. Rootstocks and stems are sometimes eaten by waterfowl. Horsetails absorb heavy metals from the soil, and are often used in bioassays for metals.

According to Carl Linnaeus, reindeer, which refuse ordinary hay, will eat this horsetail, which is juicy, and that it is cut as fodder in the north of Sweden for cows, with a view to increasing their milk yield, but that horses will not touch it.

Taxonomy
Linnaeus was the first to describe water horsetail with the binomial Equisetum sylvaticum in his Species Plantarum of 1753. In the same work, he also described the unbranched form of the plant as a separate species, E. limosum.

References

External links
 Equisetum fluviatile Water Horsetail  at Boundary Waters Canoe Area Wilderness
 Equisetum fluviatile  at World of Equisetum
 Equisetetum fluviatilis 

fluviatile
Plants described in 1753
Taxa named by Carl Linnaeus
Flora of Europe
Flora of Asia
Flora of North America
Flora of Saint Pierre and Miquelon